Goten Dam  is an earthfill dam located in Kagawa Prefecture in Japan. The dam is used for water supply. The catchment area of the dam is 0.5 km2. The dam impounds about 8  ha of land when full and can store 524 thousand cubic meters of water. The construction of the dam was started on 1937 and completed in 1954.

See also
List of dams in Japan

References

Dams in Kagawa Prefecture